Congress Township, may refer to:

Congress Township, Morrow County, Ohio
Congress Township, Wayne County, Ohio

Ohio township disambiguation pages